/= may refer to:

 Augmented assignment, an operator for division
 Relational operator, a symbol meaning not equal to
 Inequation, denoted by the character ≠
 The currency sign for the Kenyan, Tanzanian and Ugandan shillings

See also
 *= (disambiguation)